The Bayer designation Xi Capricorni (ξ Cap, ξ Capricorni) is shared by two star systems, in the constellation Capricornus:
 ξ¹ Capricorni
 ξ² Capricorni, being the brighter of the two, often simply called ξ Capricorni
They are separated by 0.25° in the sky.

Capricorni, Xi
Capricornus (constellation)